The black-necked agama (Acanthocercus atricollis) is a species of tree agama that is native to East, Central and southern Africa. Its largest continuous range is in southeastern Africa, and it occurs at high densities in the Kruger National Park.

Description

The sexes have a comparable snout-to-vent length (SVL) and have similar tail lengths. Mature males have somewhat larger heads than females, which is deemed to be an adaptation for intraspecific competition for territory. Females reach sexual maturity when about 96 mm long (SVL) and males from about 82 mm (SVL).

Habits
They form structured colonies with a dominant male, several females and juveniles. The males defend territories and engage in combat. Although mostly diurnal, they sometimes exhibit nocturnal activity. It adapts readily to the vicinity of human habitation. They are classic ambush foragers which spend only some 4% of their time moving. This involves an average of less than one movement in two minutes. When stationary, the adults position themselves on lateral branches (42% of the time), on tree trunks (35%), or occasionally on the ground (23%).

Diet
They subsist on an insect diet, which consists mainly of orthopterans, beetles and ants. Their full diet encompasses various orders (10 recorded) of arthropods. They also eat millipedes, which other lizard taxa tend to avoid. Gut contents reveal many ants (92% of items) and some beetles (4%). A large volume of orthopterans is consumed (27%), followed by beetles (26%) and ants (18%). Juvenile diet (by volume) is dominated by ants, though beetles and orthopterans are also taken. Prey diversity and volumes fluctuate seasonally.

Reproduction
Reproduction is seasonal. Testicular volume of males reaches a maximum during August to September (austral spring), and follicles of females become enlarged during August to December. Females lay a single clutch per annum, about 11 eggs on average, and larger females produce larger clutches than smaller females.

Range
It is found in Eritrea, Somalia, Ethiopia, Sudan, South Sudan, Uganda, D.R.C., Kenya, Tanzania, Zambia, Malawi, Mozambique, Zimbabwe, Angola, Botswana, Namibia, South Africa and Eswatini.

Races
Two races are usually accepted. Four more have been described however, which are not very distinct.
 A. a. atricollis (Smith, 1849) – Southern tree agama, of southern Africa
 A. a. loveridgei (Klausewitz, 1957) – Tanzania

Gallery

References 

Acanthocercus
Reptiles of Africa
Reptiles described in 1849
Taxa named by Andrew Smith (zoologist)